The 77th district of the Texas House of Representatives consists of a portion of El Paso County. The current Representative is Evelina Ortega, who has represented the district since 2017.

References 

77